ATRP may refer to:
 GTRI Agricultural Technology Research Program
 Atom transfer radical polymerization
 Avios Travel Rewards Programme